A Span of Time is a collection of 4 CD albums for cello, orchestra and piano (or harp). It includes the last recordings made by cellist Julian Lloyd Webber before his debut recording as conductor and shortly after his forced retirement from public performance due to injury in 2014.

The recordings feature cellists Julian Lloyd Webber and his wife Jiaxin Cheng, the English Chamber Orchestra, the European Union Chamber Orchestra, as well as pianist John Lenehan, harpist Catrin Finch and two former BBC Young Musician of the Year winners Guy Johnston and Laura van der Heijden.

Track listing

CD 1

CD 2

CD 3
Antonio Vivaldi
Concerto for 2 Mandolins in G major, RV 532 (arr. J. Lloyd Webber for 2 cellos, strings and harpsichord)
Concerto for 2 Cellos in G minor, RV 531
Cello Concerto in E minor, RV 409 (arr. J. Lloyd Webber for 2 cellos, strings and harpsichord)
Concerto for Oboe and Bassoon in G major, RV 545 (arr. J. Lloyd Webber for 2 cellos, strings and harpsichord)
Concerto for 2 Horns in F major, RV 539 (arr. J. Lloyd Webber for 2 cellos, strings and harpsichord)
Concerto for Oboe and Cello in G minor, RV 812 (arr. J. Lloyd Webber for 2 cellos, strings and harpsichord)
Astor Piazzolla: Concerto for Guitar and Bandoneon, Hommage à Liège: II. "Milonga" (arr. J. Lloyd Webber for 2 cellos and orchestra)

CD 4

Personnel
 Julian Lloyd Webber cello
 Jiaxin Cheng cello
 John Lenehan piano
 Catrin Finch harp
 Guy Johnston cello
 Laura van der Heijden cello
 English Chamber Orchestra
 European Union Chamber Orchestra

References

2018 classical albums
Julian Lloyd Webber albums